Blackburn is a surname of English origin. At the time of the British Census of 1881, its frequency was highest in Yorkshire, followed by Cumberland, Lancashire, Lincolnshire, Northumberland, County Durham and Norfolk. In all other British counties, its frequency was below national average. Notable people with the surname include:

Alan Blackburn (1935–2014), English footballer
Anthony Blackburn (born 1945), British Royal Navy officer
Arthur Blackburn (footballer) (born 1877), English footballer with Blackburn Rovers and Southampton
Arthur Seaforth Blackburn (1892–1960) Australian soldier, Victoria Cross recipient
Bob Blackburn (disambiguation)
Bunkie Blackburn (1936–2006), NASCAR racecar driver
Chase Blackburn (b. 1983), American football linebacker
Clare Blackburn (b. c.1962), British biologist
Clarice Blackburn (1921–1995), American actress
Colin Blackburn, Baron Blackburn (1813–1896), Scottish jurist
Dan Blackburn (b. 1983), Canadian ice hockey goaltender
David Blackburn (disambiguation), multiple people
Derek Blackburn (1934–2017), Canadian politician
Doris Blackburn (1889–1970), Australian social reformer and politician
Earl Blackburn (1892-1966), American baseball catcher
Edmond Spencer Blackburn (1868–1912), American politician
Elizabeth Blackburn (b. 1948), Australian-American molecular biologist and Nobel prize winner
Estelle Blackburn (b. 1950), Australian journalist
Fred Blackburn (1902–1990), British Member of Parliament
Fred Blackburn (footballer) (1878–1951), English international footballer
Frédéric Blackburn (b. 1972), Canadian short track speed skater
Geoffrey Blackburn (1914–2014), Australian Baptist minister
Geoffrey Blackburn (cricketer) (b. 1950), English cricketer
George Blackburn (disambiguation)
George Blackburn (American football), American football coach
George Blackburn (baseball), Major League Baseball player
George Blackburn (footballer, born 1888), English footballer
George Blackburn (footballer, born 1899), English footballer
George G. Blackburn, Canadian author
Gideon Blackburn (1772–1838), American clergyman
Harold Blackburn (1879–1959), British aviator
Howard Blackburn (1859–1932), Canadian-American sailor and fisherman
Jack Blackburn (1883–1942), American boxer and trainer
Jack Blackburn (rugby league) (b. c.1919), rugby league footballer
James Blackburn (disambiguation)
James Blackburn (architect)
James Blackburn (politician)
James Blackburn (RAF officer)
Jean-Pierre Blackburn
Jeanne Blackburn, Canadian politician from Quebec
John Blackburn (disambiguation)
John Blackburn (author)
John Blackburn (educator)
John Blackburn (musician) 
John Blackburn (politician)
John Blackburn (songwriter)
Joseph Blackburn (disambiguation)
Karoliina Blackburn
Luke P. Blackburn
Marsha Blackburn, United States Senator from Tennessee.
Maurice Blackburn
Michael Blackburn (disambiguation)
Michael Blackburn (athlete) (born 1970), Australian Olympic medallist and sailor
Michael Blackburn (poet) (born 1954), British poet
Nick Blackburn, Major League Baseball player
Olly Blackburn, filmmaker and screenwriter
Paul Blackburn (disambiguation)
Peter Blackburn (disambiguation)
Robert Blackburn (disambiguation)
Robert Blackburn (artist)
Robert Blackburn (aviation pioneer)
Robert Blackburn (educationalist)
Robert Blackburn (politician)
Robert McGrady Blackburn 
Robin Blackburn, philosopher
Simon Blackburn, philosopher
Thomas Blackburn (disambiguation)
Thomas Blackburn (entomologist)
Dr Thomas "Tom" Blackburn, pharmacologist
Thomas Blackburn (poet)
Tom Blackburn (basketball)
Tom W. Blackburn, writer, lyricist
John T. "Tommy" Blackburn, U.S. aviator
Thornton Blackburn, escaped fugitive slave from Kentucky
Tony Blackburn (born 1943), English disc jockey with Radio Caroline, Radio London and the BBC
Tyler Blackburn (born 1986), American actor, singer and model
William Blackburn, British architect

References

See also 
 Blackburne (disambiguation)
Blackburn, Lancashire, England

English toponymic surnames
English-language surnames
Surnames of British Isles origin